Amatuni is an ancient Armenian noble family, known from the 4th century in the canton of Artaz, between lakes Van and Urmia, with its center at Shavarshan (latter-day Maku), and subsequently also at Aragatsotn, west of Lake Sevan, with the residence at Oshakan.

Medieval dynasty 
The Amatuni who was of Caspio-Median or Matianian-Mannaean origin, is given a specious Jewish ancestry from descendants of Samson by the early Armenian tradition (Moses of Chorene 2.57). Their forefather's name Manue suggests a possible connection with the royal Assyrian house of Adiabene.
They were variously attributed a descent from Astyages of Media and a Hebrew descent. Also, Armenian princely family of Amatuni believed to be descendants of the kings (chieftains) of the Matienian tribes 

Apparently, starting from 336 A.D. the Amatuni princes were in charge of the tax service of the Armenian kingdom, when the Arshakids bestowed on them the fortress and possession of Oshakan in the heart of their Ayrarat royal domain, not far from the capital of the kingdom Dvin(Moses of Chorene 2.57). Historians described the battle that took place in 336 near Oshakan, between Armenians and Persians, in which Armenians won. For his valor in the liberation wars, in 336, the Armenian king Khosrov III presented Oshakan to Vahan Amatuni. During the wars, the Amatuni sent their Suzerain (overlord), the king of Armenia, 500 horses and cavalry soldiers, which shows the political weight and military potential of this grand princely family. . 
At the initiative of the princes Amatuni, Mesrop Mashtots, the creator of the Armenian alphabet, was buried here. As Nakharars the Amatuni owned Oshakan until 773, after which these lands came under the control of the Bagratids.

After the Sassanids of Iran abolished the Arsacid monarchy in Armenia in 428, Vahan (II) Amatuni was appointed by the Great King as assistant governor to the Iranian marzpan. However, Sassanid propagation of Zoroastrianism among the Christian Armenians caused the reversal of the Amatuni's loyalty and, in 451, Vahan revolted, only to be banished to Gorgan. In 451, the famous Battle of Avarayr between Armenians and Persians took place in Artaz, south of Maku.

Ironically, when preparations were underway for another insurrection in 482, it was an Amatuni, Varaz Sapuh, who revealed the plan to the Iranians. During the Roman-Iranian war of 572-91, Kotit Amatuni, together with other Armenian princes exasperated by the bureaucratic oppression of the emperor Maurice, fought on the Iranian side, but Kotit fell into disgrace c. 596 at Ctesiphon, and the king of Iran had him executed.

The transfer of regional power from the Sassanids to Muslim Arab rule provoked a large-scale aristocratic insurrection of 774-75. The revolt's failure forced many of its leaders to flee to Lazica or the Byzantine Empire. Sapuh Amatuni, his son Haman, and some 12,000 followers moved to Byzantium and established the Principality of Hamamshen in the Black Sea region of Lazistan.

In the 9th century, Amatuni still remained in the possession of Artaz, but under the suzerainty of the Artsruni of Vaspurakan. In the 13th and 14th centuries, this house, under the name of Vachutean, once more came to prominence in the Georgian sphere of influence; under the suzerainty of the Mkhargrdzeli (Zakarid) princes, they ruled again over Aragatsotn, as well as a portion of Shirak and Nig, a key fortress in Amberd. The Vachutean genealogy, based on epigraphic data, was reconstructed by Marie Brosset and can be found in his Rapports sur un voyage archéologique dans la Géorgie et dans l'Arménie (St. Petersburg 1849-1851) III: 99-100.

The Artazian branch of Amatuni family was ruling castle of Maku (Shavarshan) stil in XVth century and successfully defend it during Timurleng invasion, when he besieged castle of Maku, as was stated in his book by Castilian diplomat don Ruy González de Clavijo, when he was traveling to the imperial court of emir Timurleng in Samarkand.

A branch of the family still controlled a fiefdom of Artaz in Maku down to the 1500s when Ottomans and Kurdish tribes toppled Armenian rule in the region. while the branch which ruled Hamamshen was overthrown in the 15th century after the Ottomans invaded the empire of Trebizond and exiled its last prince Baron David II to Ispir.

Later family 

After the Middle Ages the Amatuni family disappeared from history, though in 1784 a family of the same name was recognized as descended from it, and therefore as princely, in the kingdom of Georgia. In the 17th century, one of the representatives of the Amatuni clan, a certain Azarbek I Amatuni, son of Prince George Amatuni, was a melik of the city of Nakhichevan-on-Arax. Melik Azarbek I had sons George, Petros (Peter) and Vahan, who faithfully served with their father the Iranian shah. The children and grandchildren of one of the sons, Peter Azarbekyan Amatuni, moved to the city of Tiflis, where on January 1, 1784, King Irakli II confirmed Sarkis (Sergey) Azaryan Petrovich Amatuni with his sons Stepan, Karapet, Gregory and his nephew Yakov Ivanovich Amatuni, they were in charge of the dignity of their ancestors, "who were at the time of the Armenian kings, the resplendent princes." At the same time, the coat of arms was approved by the charter of the Georgian king Heraclius II of January 1, 1784.
Another branch of the Amatuni clan, descendants of Allahverdi khan Amatuni, were meliks in Karadagh (Arasbaran) until 1918; and also, they were on the board of directors of oil companies of Baku until 1917. After the Russian annexation of Georgia, the family was confirmed in the dignity of Knyaz on March 25, 1826.

See also 
Hemshin peoples
Principality of Hamamshen
Hemşin

References 

Amatuni family